DYFU-TV, known as GNN Roxas was a commercial/relay television station owned by Wesfardell Cable Services under the operations of Global News Network. Its studio and transmitter are located at Wesfardell Bldg., Lapu-lapu Street, Roxas City, Capiz.

Television channels and stations established in 2010
Television stations in Roxas, Capiz